The teeing ground is the area where play begins in a hole of golf. The terms tee, tee box, and "teeing ground" are synonymous.  The name derives from the physical device used to elevate a golf ball before striking it to commence play.

The boundaries of the teeing ground are defined by a pair of tee markers. The front, left and right sides of the tee are denoted by the outer edges of the tee markers, assuming the perspective of a player standing in the teeing ground and facing the hole. The teeing ground is two club-lengths in depth. Playing from outside the teeing area or from the wrong tee is a breach of the rules of golf.

Most courses have different colour-coded sets of tee markers, which allow them to be played from a variety of different distances, often to suit players of different abilities. The foremost tee is designed to accommodate the shorter drives of women and is referred to as the "ladies tee", with tee boxes of increasing difficulty being placed further back.

References 

Golf terminology

sv:Lista över golftermer#Tee